Philip Gelatt is an American film director, writer, producer and video game writer. He is best known for his work on the animated film, The Spine of Night and the Netflix animated series, Love, Death & Robots.

Life and career
Gelatt was born in La Crosse, Wisconsin. He graduated from New York University in Cinema Studies with a minor in Anthropology and has worked in the comic book industry.

Gelatt's debut feature film, The Bleeding House, premiered at the Tribeca Film Festival in 2011. In 2013, He wrote the science fiction film Europa Report, directed by Sebastián Cordero. Along with Rhianna Pratchett, he co-wrote his debut video game, Rise of the Tomb Raider in 2015. In 2018, he wrote, directed and produced the film They Remain, based on Laird Barron's short story -30-. In 2021, he co-directed and co-wrote the 2D adult animated film The Spine of Night, along with Morgan Galen King, which premiered at South by Southwest.

Filmography 
Film

Television

Video game
 Rise of the Tomb Raider (2015)

Publications 
 2008 - Indiana Jones Adventures Volume 1 
 2008 - Labor Days 
 2011 - Petrograd

Awards and nominations

References

External links 
 

Living people
American film directors
American male screenwriters
American film producers
Video game writers
American television writers
American male television writers
21st-century American male writers
Year of birth missing (living people)